The 1998–99 ECHL season was the 11th season of the ECHL. Before the start of the season, the league saw the Louisville RiverFrogs move to Miami, FL and the Raleigh Icecaps move to Augusta, GA as well as welcoming two new franchises in Estero, FL and Greenville, SC. The Pee Dee Pride finished first overall in the regular season, winning the Brabham Cup and the Mississippi Sea Wolves won their first Kelly Cup defeating the Richmond Renegades four games to three.

Regular season

Final standings 
Note: GP = Games played; W = Wins; L= Losses; T = Ties; GF = Goals for; GA = Goals against; Pts = Points; Green shade = Clinched playoff spot; Blue shade = Clinched division; (z) = Clinched home-ice advantage

Northern Conference

Southern Conference

Kelly Cup playoffs

Northern Conference

Quarterfinals

Semifinals

Finals

Southern Conference

Wild Card

Quarterfinals

Semifinals

Finals

Kelly Cup finals

ECHL awards

See also 
 ECHL
 ECHL All-Star Game
 Kelly Cup
 List of ECHL seasons

ECHL seasons
ECHL season, 1998-99